Senator Keegan may refer to:

Betty Ann Keegan (1920–1974), Illinois State Senate
Joseph M. Keegan (1922–2007), New Jersey State Senate